Achaeus of Syracuse (lived 4th century BC) was an ancient Greek tragedian native of Syracuse. The Suda ascribes to him 10 plays, while the Pseudo-Eudocia 14. He may be the "Achaios" who won a victory at Athens' Lenaia festival in 356 BC.

References
"Achaios (1)" from the Suda
 Smith, William; Dictionary of Greek and Roman Biography and Mythology, "Achaeus (3)", Boston, (1867)

Ancient Greek dramatists and playwrights
Ancient Syracusans
Sicilian Greeks
4th-century BC Greek people
Year of birth unknown
Year of death unknown